John White (born April 7, 1959) is an American politician who served as a member of the Ohio House of Representatives for the 38th district from 2001 to 2008.

Early life and education
White was born in Dayton, Ohio. He earned a bachelor's degree in marketing from Wright State University.

Career 
White had been active in Republican politics throughout Dayton metropolitan area, serving as chair of the Montgomery County Central Committee, president of the Montgomery County Young Republicans, and as a Montgomery County Republican Party Executive Committee member. Outside of politics, he has worked as a human resources consultant.

Ohio House of Representatives 
With longtime Representative Bob Corbin unable to run for another term due to term limits, White ran for the Ohio House of Representatives. He obtained the Republican nomination with 52.36% of the vote, and won the general election with 60.9% of the electorate. He won reelection in 2002 with 61.44% of the vote, again in 2004 with 60.64%, and again in 2006 with 55.64%.

During his time in the legislature, White served as Chairman of the House Health Committee in the 125th Ohio General Assembly, and as Chairman of the Criminal Justice Committee in the 127th Ohio General Assembly.

Term limits required White to relinquish his seat in 2008, and he was replaced by Terry Blair. Since his time as a legislator, White has become an advocate for local charities and philanthropy.

Personal life 
White is married with three children.

References

Republican Party members of the Ohio House of Representatives
1946 births
Living people
21st-century American politicians
Politicians from Dayton, Ohio